Albrecht Wolfgang, Count of Schaumburg-Lippe (27 April 1699 – 24 September 1748) was a ruler of the County of Schaumburg-Lippe.

Biography
He was born in Bückeburg the son of Friedrich Christian, Count of Schaumburg-Lippe and his first wife, Countess Johanna Sophia of Hohenlohe-Langenburg (1673–1743).  He succeeded his father as Count on 13 June 1728. In 1743, he joined Maria Theresa of Austria and Schaumburg-Lippe led during the War of the Austrian Succession. He died at Bückeburg and was succeeded as Count by his son Wilhelm.

Marriages and children

He was married firstly to Countess Margarete Gertrud of Oeynhausen (1701–1726), an illegitimate daughter of George I of Great Britain and his mistress Melusine von der Schulenburg, Duchess of Kendal, on 30 October 1721 at London. They had two children:

Count Georg Wilhelm (1722–1742), killed in a duel at age 20
Count William (1724–1777)

He was married secondly to Princess Charlotte of Nassau-Siegen (1702–1785) on 26 April 1730 at Varel. She was the eldest daughter of Frederick William Adolf, Prince of Nassau-Siegen and his wife, Landgravine Elisabeth Juliana Francisca of Hesse-Homburg.

He had at least two illegitimate sons: 
 August Wolfrath von Campen (1730-1779), who married Countess Wilhelmine von Anhalt, morganatic daughter of Prince William Gustav of Anhalt-Dessau
 Wolfradine von Campen (1773-1794), married Count Adolf Friedrich Werner von der Schulenburg (1759-1825)
 Karl Wilhelm Wolfgang von Donop (1740-1813), illegitimate son with Charlotte Sophie of Aldenburg
 Georg von Donop.

References

External links
Schaumburg-Lippe Nobility

1699 births
1748 deaths
People from Bückeburg
Counts of Lippe
House of Lippe
People from Schaumburg-Lippe